Bernardim Ribeiro (1482October 1552) was a Renaissance Portuguese poet and writer.

Early life
Ribeiro was a native of Torrão in the Alentejo. His father, Damião Ribeiro, was implicated in a conspiracy against King John II in 1484, and had to flee to Castile, while young Bernardim and his mother took refuge with their relatives António and Inês Zagalo at Quinta dos Lobos, near Sintra.

When Manuel I came to the Portuguese throne in 1495, he rehabilitated the families persecuted by his predecessor, and Ribeiro was able to leave his retreat and return to Torrão. Meanwhile Dona Inês had married a rich landowner of Estremoz, and in 1503 she was summoned to court and appointed one of the attendants to the Infanta Beatriz. Ribeiro accompanied her, and through her influence the king took him under his protection and sent him to the University of Lisbon, where he studied from 1506 to 1512.

Scandal and exile
He took part in the historic , or palace evening entertainments, which largely consisted of poetical improvisations. There he met, and earned the friendship of the poets Sá de Miranda and Cristóvão Falcão, who became his literary comrades and the confidantes of his romance, in which hope deferred and bitter disappointment ended in tragedy.

Ribeiro had early conceived a violent passion for his cousin, Dona Joana Zagalo, the daughter of his protector, Dona Inês. However, her family opposed her marriage to a singer and dreamer with small means and prospects, and finally compelled her to wed a rich man, one Pero Gato. When the latter died shortly afterwards, Joanna retired to a house in the country, where it was rumoured that Ribeiro was a visitor, and in 1521 she went into seclusion in the convent of St Clare at Estremoz, where she died some years later. It was alleged that Ribeiro's conduct had caused a scandal which led the king to deprive him of his office and exile him.

Ribeiro poured out his heart in five eclogues, the earliest in Portuguese, written in the popular octosyllabic verse; and now, hopeless of the future and broken in spirit, he decided to go to Italy, for a poet the land of promise. The title can be translated as Maiden and Modest, and is regarded as one of the finest examples of the genre of pastoral romance in Renaissance literature.

Return and decline
When he returned home in 1524, the new king, John III, restored him to his former post, and it is said that he paid a last visit to his love at St Clare's convent and found her in a fit of madness. From that time his mental powers declined. About 1534 he suffered a long illness, and he continued to decline until his death. He was unable to fulfil the duties of his office, and in 1549 the king bestowed upon him a pension for his support. He did not live long to enjoy it, as in 1552 he died at All Saints Hospital in Lisbon.

The  was not printed until after Ribeiro's death, and then first in Ferrara in 1554. On its appearance the book made such a sensation that its reading was forbidden, because it disclosed a family tragedy which the allegory could not hide. It is divided into two parts, the first of which is certainly the work of Ribeiro. However, opinion has been divided on the second. One edition of the first part was made by Dr José Pessanha (Oporto, 1891), and a more current edition was made in 2012 (see bibliography). Ribeiro's verses, including his five eclogues, were reprinted in a limited edition by Dr Xavier da Cunha (Lisbon, 1886).

Bibliography

References

External links
 
 
 

1482 births
1552 deaths
Portuguese poets
Portuguese male poets
Portuguese Renaissance writers
16th-century Portuguese people
15th-century Portuguese people
People from Setúbal District